Francesco Marco Nicola Monterisi (born 28 May 1934) is an Italian cardinal of the Catholic Church, who worked in the diplomatic service of the Holy See from 1964 to 1998 and then held senior positions in the Roman Curia until he retired in 2014.

Early life and ordination
After his elementary and secondary studies in Barletta, he entered the Pontifical Minor Seminary and then the Pontifical Major Seminary. From 1951 to 1958, he studied at the Pontifical Lateran University, where he obtained a doctorate in theology.

Monterisi was ordained to the priesthood on 16 March 1957 and returned to Apulia for several years. Beginning in 1961 he prepared for a diplomat's career at the Pontifical Ecclesiastical Academy while also earning a doctorate in canon law at the Pontifical Lateran University in 1964, the year he joined the diplomatic service of the Holy See.

Nuncio
On 24 December 1982, he was appointed Pro-Nuncio to Korea and Titular Archbishop of Alba Maritima. Monterisi received his episcopal consecration on 6 January 1983 from Pope John Paul II, with Archbishops Eduardo Martínez Somalo and Duraisamy Simon Lourdusamy serving as co-consecrators.

In 1990 Monterisi was appointed delegate for Pontifical Representations, the personnel chief not only for Vatican diplomats but for the whole Roman curia.

Pope John Paul named him the first Apostolic Nuncio to Bosnia and Herzegovina on 11 June 1993.

Roman Curia

Pope John Paul named him Secretary of the Congregation for Bishops on 7 March 1998. While serving at the Congregation for Bishops he was also secretary of the College of Cardinals. He was secretary of the 2005 papal conclave, which elected Pope Benedict XVI.

On 21 December 2002, he was made a member of the Pontifical Council for the Pastoral Care of Migrants and Itinerant People.

On 3 July 2009, Pope Benedict appointed Archbishop Monterisi to the post of Archpriest of the Basilica of Saint Paul Outside-the-Walls.

On 20 November 2010, he was created Cardinal-Deacon of San Paolo alla Regola. On 29 December 2010, he was appointed a member of the Congregation for the Oriental Churches and the Congregation for the Causes of Saints. On 24 October 2012, Monterisi was appointed a member of the Congregation for Bishops.

He was one of the cardinal electors who participated in the 2013 papal conclave that elected Pope Francis.

After ten years at the rank of cardinal deacon, he exercised his option to assume the rank of cardinal priest, which Pope Francis confirmed on 3 May 2021.

Notes

References

External links

 
Catholic-Hierarchy 
Interview on Opus Dei

 

1934 births
Living people
People from the Province of Barletta-Andria-Trani
20th-century Italian Roman Catholic titular archbishops
Pontifical Ecclesiastical Academy alumni
Pontifical Lateran University alumni
Pontifical Roman Seminary alumni
Members of the Congregation for Bishops
Members of the Congregation for the Oriental Churches
Members of the Congregation for the Causes of Saints
21st-century Italian cardinals
Cardinals created by Pope Benedict XVI
Apostolic Nuncios to Bosnia and Herzegovina
Apostolic Nuncios to South Korea